Phorocerosoma is a genus of flies in the family Tachinidae.

Species
P. aurea Sun & Chao, 1994
P. pilipes (Villeneuve, 1916)
P. postulans (Walker, 1861)
P. vicarium (Walker, 1856)

References

Diptera of Asia
Exoristinae
Tachinidae genera
Taxa named by Charles Henry Tyler Townsend